Richard Pennant, 1st Baron Penrhyn (1737 – 21 January 1808), was a Welsh politician and nobleman who served as an MP in the British Parliament, representing Petersfield and Liverpool for 29 years between 1761 and 1790. He was the owner of Penrhyn Castle, an estate on the outskirts on Bangor, North Wales.

Pennant was also an absentee owner of six sugar plantations and slaves in Jamaica. In Parliament, Pennant was a staunch proslavery advocate who opposed the abolitionist movement. In Wales, Pennant was a major figure in the development of the Welsh slate industry. He received an Irish peerage from King George III in 1783, and died in 1808, leaving his estates to George Hay Dawkins.

Early life
Pennant was the second son of John Pennant, a Liverpool-based merchant, and his wife Bonella Hodges, a wealthy heiress from the British colony of Jamaica. He was educated at Newcome's School in Hackney, and was admitted to Trinity College, Cambridge on 18 January 1754.

Political career

Pennant entered the House of Commons as an MP representing Petersfield at the 1761 general election alongside William Jolliffe under an arrangement with William Beckford. He intended to represent Liverpool in the House of Commons at the next election, but when a vacancy arose in 1767, he was returned unopposed at a by-election on 4 December 1767. He successfully contested Liverpool in 1768, and again in 1774. In the 1780 general election, he was defeated at Liverpool. On the recommendation of Charles James Fox, he was granted an Irish peerage from King George III and created 1st Baron Penrhyn of Penrhyn in the county of Lough, Ireland in 1783. Holding an Irish peerage did not disqualify him from standing for elections to the House of Commons as, both before and after the Acts of Union, Irish peerages were used to create peers who could not sit in the House of Lords but who could do so in the House of Commons.

In the 1784 general election, Penrhyn again contested Liverpool and was returned as MP to Parliament. In the ensuing parliament he is said to have made over thirty speeches relating to the West Indies and trade in Liverpool. There was a debate on the slave trade in May 1788, and it was reported that the only two MP's who spoke in favor of the trade were Penrhyn and Bamber Gascoyne. He stood again for Liverpool at the 1790 general election and was ahead in the poll, but withdrew in favour of Sir Banastre Tarleton, who was also a staunch proslavery advocate.

Estates and involvement in slate industry
Pennant owned numerous properties in Caernarfonshire, Wales, half of which he inherited from his wife, Ann Susannah Pennant née Warburton, the daughter of British Army officer Hugh Warburton; the other half he inherited from his father, who was Warburton's business partner. As the owner of Penrhyn quarry, he was prominent in the development of the Welsh slate industry.

Pennant was also the absentee owner of six sugar plantations in Jamaica, which were operated with the forced labour of over six hundred enslaved Africans. Despite this, Pennant never visited the island, managing them from his estates in Britain. The wealth Pennant generated from his sugar plantations were invested by him into road and dock construction, alongside the Welsh slate industry- most prominently the Penrhyn quarry.

Death and legacy
On his death on 21 January 1808, Penrhyn's entire estate went to his second cousin, politician George Hay Dawkins, who subsequently adopted the surname of Dawkins-Pennant. Dawkins' daughter Juliana and her husband were named as co-heirs of the estate on the condition that they also took the surname Pennant, which they duly accepted. Dawkins' son-in-law, Edward Gordon Douglas, was later created 1st Baron Penrhyn of Llandygai.  The widowed Lady Penrhyn moved to a home in Grosvenor Square.

References

Citations

Books

Websites

Further reading 
 

1737 births
1808 deaths
Alumni of Trinity College, Cambridge
Barons in the Peerage of Ireland
British MPs 1761–1768
British MPs 1768–1774
British MPs 1774–1780
British MPs 1784–1790
British slave owners
Pennant, Richard
Peers of Ireland created by George III
People educated at Newcome's School